Biv 10 Records was founded by Michael Bivins in 1992, through a joint venture with Motown Records.

History
In the early 1990s, Bivins’ Biv Entertainment management firm scored multiple successes with developing new acts (Boyz II Men, Another Bad Creation, and MC Brains) in conjunction with Motown Records.  As a result, Motown bankrolled Bivins his own imprint, Biv 10 Records.  The company's logo featured an outline of a hand holding a basketball with the name ‘BIV 10’ printed on the hand above the wrist.

While the label went on to score minor success with teen R&B groups Subway and 702, significant success largely evaded the company.  The more prominent acts that Bivins had been responsible for, like Boyz II Men, were established before the commencement of the Biv 10 label, and were instead signed to Motown directly—where they remained after the launch.

In 2000, distribution of Biv 10 switched from Motown to Universal Records, with the release of BBD, the studio album from Bell Biv Devoe. In 2002, the label was dismantled & folded into Motown.

This is a list of artists who recorded for Biv 10 Records.
Listed in parentheses are names of affiliated labels for which the artist recorded for Biv 10 in conjunction with.

Artists
 Bell Biv DeVoe
 Boyz II Men
 702
 Another Bad Creation
 Yvette Nicole Brown (Formerly: Yvette)
 Val Young (Formerly: Lady V)
 MC Brains
 Subway 
 Outsiderz 4 Life (Formerly: Sudden Impact & Whytgize)
 The Transitions
 Hayden
 Fruit Punch
 Mag 7
 Rico Anderson
 Big Ant
 10/10
 TomBoyy
 Cale’
 Khalil
 Mark Finesse
 Tam Rock & E.Q.
 Antuan & Ray (of Mag 7, Antuan now known as Robert Curry, 1/4 member of R&B group Day26) 
 P-Nutt
 Shortee Red
 Lil' Nique & DJ Jus
 Tay Boogie
 Mark Wilson (Producer)

Discography

Bell Biv DeVoe
 1990: Poison 
 1993: Hootie Mack 
 2001: BBD 
 2017: Three Stripes

Boyz II Men
 1991: Cooleyhighharmony 
 1994: II 
 1997: Evolution 
 2000: Nathan Michael Shawn Wanya 
 2002: Full Circle 
 2004: Throwback, Vol. 1 
 2006: The Remedy 
 2007: Motown: A Journey Through Hitsville USA 
 2009: Love 
 2011: Twenty 
 2014: Collide

Another Bad Creation
 1991: Coolin' at the Playground Ya Know!
 1993: It Ain't What U Wear, It's How U Play It

Val Young
1985: Seduction
1987: Private Conversations

Subway
 1995: Good Times

MC Brains
1992: Lovers Lane

702
 1996: No Doubt 
 1999: 702 
 2003: Star

Outsiderz 4 Life
 1992: Untitled Album (unreleased) (As Sudden Inpact) (Biv 10 Records/Motown)
 1997: Untitled Album (unreleased) (As Whytgize) (Stonecreek Records/Capitol)
 2000: www.outsiderz4life.com (Shelved) (Virgin/Blackground Entertainment)
 2007: Outsiderz 4 Life (VSD Entertainment)
 2015: Sudden Impact - WhytGize - Outsiderz Compilation 1 (TAVA Entertainment)

The Transitions 
 2001: Back in da Days

Hayden
 1995: Untitled Album (unreleased)

Mag 7
 1997: The Street Mix

East Coast Family
 1992:  East Coast Family Volume One

Biv 10 Pee Wee All-Stars
 1999: The Adventures Of The Biv 10 Pee Wee All-Stars

See also
 List of record labels

Discogs: https://www.discogs.com/label/102950-Biv-10-Records

Record labels established in 1992
Record labels disestablished in 2002
Defunct record labels of the United States
Contemporary R&B record labels
Pop record labels
Motown